Two is the second album by Charlottesville, Virginia eclectic duo, Soko, released in 2005, almost ten years after their debut album, In November Sunlight, released in 1996. Soko started out as a trio until drummer John Gilmore, who appeared on the first album, left the band. Gilmore appears as a guest performer on this album. In addition to Gilmore, ten various artists are heard, including guitarist Tim Reynolds. The album was recorded in the Dave Matthews Band's Haunted Hollow Studio, and features several tracks which were performed live by Soko throughout the 1990s, as well as several new studio songs, and a cover of The Beatles' "Rain." The songs "Plant the Sky," "Joy of Love," and "Rain" were edited and released as singles for radio play.

Track listing
"Storyteller" – 2:08 
"Plant the Sky" – 8:06
"Speak Up" – 4:50
"Dark Beam of the Seine" – 6:08
"On the Matter of Coping" – 3:18
"Antidote" – 5:57
"In-between, I" – 3:54
"Joy of Love" – 15:55
"Rain" – 9:44
"Bamboo Cool" – 4:41
"Stella: Reflections" – 2:35
"In-between, II" – 5:02

Personnel
Soko
Michael Sokolowski – piano, synthesizers, tar, bells, xylophone, shakers, electric guitar
Houston Ross – bass, vocals, talking drum, log drum, nylon string guitar

Guest musicians
Tim Reynolds – guitar
David Darling – cello
John D'Earth – trumpet
Olumide – percussion
Will Coles – drums
John Gilmore – drums
Davina Jackson – vocals
Peter Spaar – acoustic bass
Chris Melchoir – violins, viola
Worth Proffitt – percussion
Peter Markush – cello

References

External links
Soko recordings – Soko's official website
Two – Breezeway Records website

2005 albums
Sokoband albums
Breezeway Records albums